Mary Clark Webster is an American politician from Maine. A Republican, Webster served in the Maine House of Representatives. In 1989–90, she was the House Minority Leader.
 The 126th legislature passed a joint resolution honoring Webster and other prominent female political figures in the state.

References

Year of birth missing (living people)
Living people
Minority leaders of the Maine House of Representatives
Maine Republicans
People from Cape Elizabeth, Maine
Women state legislators in Maine